Live is Lara Fabian's first live album and fourth in total. The album was released in 1999.

Track listing

2 CDs edition

1 CD edition

Charts

Certifications

References

External links
 Lara Fabian Official Website

Lara Fabian albums
1999 live albums
Polydor Records live albums